Tannereye Ltd is the first company in the world to produce leather covered sunglasses.. It was established in 1976 by Peter and Maureen Leunes on Prince Edward Island.

Tannereye was the first company to adhere very thin leather to optical frames.

History
In the early 70s  Peter Leunes had the idea of putting leather onto eyeglass frames. It took several years to make this concept a reality. They used a process that immersed the plastic frame in an acetone solution, activating the plastic surface to allow the leather to adhere permanently. Tannereye Ralph Lauren's Polo was one of the first companies retail this product.  The company's major client for many years was Bausch & Lomb, where leather was applied to Wayfarers and Aviator frames.  In 22 years, Tannereye produced over five million leather covered glasses. In the later years of the company also produced leather appliques on apparel, screens and leather covered sculptures.

Because of the steady Bausch & Lomb orders, Tannereye was a major Charlottetown employer through the 1980s  but dependence on a single product for revenue was a challenge for long term stability. To address this, Peter Leunes, with employees Frank Hale and Carl Drew, developed and marketed new products mostly in the decorative accessory line.

Closure
The Leunes family eventually sold their interests in the company to a group of employees who developed the new products further and who operated it successfully in areas of leather covered sculptures for several years. Loss of the annual order from Bausch & Lomb, and the arrival of new competitors in Japan  eroded the financial stability which the company had enjoyed and the company was closed.

See also
Browline glasses
Horn-rimmed glasses
Rimless eyeglasses

References

Companies based in Prince Edward Island
Manufacturing companies established in 1976
1976 establishments in Prince Edward Island